Hermann or Herrmann is the German origin of the given name Herman.

People with the name include:

Given name
 Arminius (18/17 BC – AD 21), the Roman name for a chieftain of the Germanic Cherusci, who defeated a Roman army in the Battle of the Teutoburg Forest; at one time his original name, which is unknown, was speculated to be Hermann, although more common Germanic given names are at least as likely, e.g. Ermen/Irmin "universal", "strong" etc.
Hermann Abert (1871–1927), German historian of music
Hermann Balk (died 1239), Teutonic knight
Hermann Baranowski (1884–1940), German Nazi SS concentration camp commandant
Hermann Baumgarten (1825–1893), a German historian and political publicist
Hermann Behrends (1907–1948), German Nazi SS officer executed for war crimes
Hermann Billung, a Margrave of Saxony
Hermann Bondi (1919–2005), Anglo–Austrian mathematician and cosmologist
Hermann Burmeister (1807–1892), German zoologist
Hermann Ebbinghaus (1850–1909)
Hermann Fegelein (1906–1945), Waffen–SS General
Hermann Fressant, 14th century writer
Hermann Goldschmidt (1802–1866), German–French astronomer who discovered the asteroid Lutetia
Hermann Göring, leading member of the NSDAP
Hermann Grassmann (1809–1877), German linguist and mathematician
Hermann Gundert, a German missionary who compiled the first Malayalam–English dictionary
Hermann Harms (1870–1942), German botanist
Hermann von Helmholtz (1821–1894), German physicist
Hermann Hesse (1877–1962), German poet, novelist, and painter
Hermann Hoth (1885–1971), German military officer
Hermann Hreiðarsson, footballer of Icelandic descent
Hermann Huppen (born 1938), a Belgian comic book artist
Hermann Lang (1909–1987), German race car driver
Hermann Löhr (1871–1943), English composer
Hermann Maier, Austrian skier
Hermann Merkin (1907–1999), Jewish–American businessman
Hermann Minkowski (1864-1909), Lithuanian-born mathematician who devised the idea of four–dimensional spacetime
Hermann Müller (disambiguation), the name of several individuals
Hermann Muthesius (1861–1927), German architect
Hermann Oberth (1894–1989), Romanian and German physicist
Hermann Panzo (1958–1999), French sprinter
Hermann Pister (1885–1948), German Nazi SS concentration camp commandant
Hermann Prey (1929–1998), German lyric baritone
Hermann Rauschning, German conservative and reactionary, opponent of the Nazi party
Hermann Rieck (c. 1837-1921), German-born pioneer farmer in Australia
Hermann von Salza, Grand Master of the Teutonic Knights
Hermann Scherchen (1891–1966), German conductor
Hermann Schlegel (1804–1884), German ornithologist
Hermann von Siemens (1885–1986), former head of German electronics company Siemens AG
Hermann Stern (1878–1952), Austrian lawyer and politician
Hermann de Stern (1815–1887), German–born British banker.
Hermann Wendland (1825–1903), German botanist
Hermann Weyl (1885–1955), German mathematician
Hermann A. Widemann (1822–1899), German businessman and Kingdom of Hawaii cabinet member
Hermann Wilken (1522–1603), German humanist and mathematician
Hermann Winterhalter (1808–1891), German painter
Hermann Zapf (1918–2015), German typeface designer

Surname
Albert Herrmann (1886–1945), German archaeologist and geographer
Alexander Herrmann (1844–1896), German magician known as "The Great Herrmann"
Arnulf Herrmann (born 1968), German composer
August Hermann (1835–1906), German physical education instructor
Bernard Herrmann (1911–1975), American composer
Binger Hermann (1843–1926), American attorney and politician in Oregon
Boris Herrmann (born 1981), German yachtsman
David Hermann (born 1977), a German–French stage director
Deborah Hermann (born 1954), American activist and municipal politician
Dieter B. Herrmann (1939–2021), German astronomer
Ed Herrmann (1946–2013), American baseball player
Edward Herrmann (1943–2014), American actor
Eleanor Krohn Herrmann (1935–2012), American nurse and educator
Erika Hermann, birth name of Erika Steinbach (born 1943)
Fernand Herrmann (1886–1925), French silent film actor
George H. Hermann, Hermann Park
Helen Herrman, Australian psychiatrist and academic
Georgina Herrmann (born 1937), British archaeologist and academic
Hajo Herrmann (1913–2010), German Luftwaffe (Nazi Germany air force) bomber pilot
Jacob Herrmann, German rugby union international
Jakob Hermann (1678–1733), Swiss mathematician
Jakob Herrmann (born 1987), Austrian ski mountaineer and paraglider
Joachim Herrmann (born 1956), German politician
Johann Hermann (1738–1800), French zoologist
Johannes Hermann (1515–1593), German cantor, hymn writer and jurist
Johann Gottfried Jakob Hermann (1772–1848), German classical scholar and philologist
John "JoJo" Hermann, American musician
Judith Hermann (born 1970), German short story writer
Kai Hermann (born 1938), German journalist
Ken Hermann (disambiguation)
Lars Herrmann (born 1977), German politician
Ludimar Hermann (1838–1914), German physiologist and speech scientist
Luke Herrmann (1932–2016), British art historian
Mark Herrmann (born 1959), American football player and broadcaster
Margaret Hermann (born 1938), American political psychologist
Michael Herrmann (born 1944), German festival director
Mirko Hermann (1868–1927), Croatian industrialist and businessman
Moses Herrman (1858–1927), American lawyer, politician, and judge
Ned Herrmann (1922–1999), American creativity researcher and author
Paul Hermann (disambiguation), several people
Peter Hermann (disambiguation), several people
Peter Herrmann (1941–2015), German composer and academic teacher
Reinhard Herrmann (1925–2002), German graphic artist and book illustrator
Robert Hermann (disambiguation), several people
Vanessa Herrmann (born 1991), Thai actress and model
Walter Herrmann (born 1979), Argentinian basketball player
Walter Herrmann (physicist) (1910–1987), German nuclear physicist
Wilhelm Herrmann (1846–1922), German theologian
Winfried Hermann (born 1952), German politician
Wolfgang A. Herrmann (born 1948), German chemist and academic administrator

Fictional characters
Herman Hermann, a one–armed character from the American TV series The Simpsons

See also
Hermann (disambiguation)
Herman (name)
Hermans
Arman (name)
Armand (name)
Germanus (disambiguation)
Germán
Germain (disambiguation)

References

German-language surnames
German masculine given names
Surnames from given names